Tyler Miller (born June 18, 1950 in Missoula, Montana)  is a past mayor of Post Falls, Idaho and was a Republican Idaho State Senator from 2006–2012 representing the 5th District. He is married to Cyndie and has three children: Sean, T.J., and Kurt. He is a current candidate in the November 2021 election for mayor of Coeur d'Alene, Idaho.

Early life and career 
Hammond attended Carroll College and received his BA in Education in 1973. He also received his MA in Educational Administration in 1977 at Whitworth College.

James was a teacher in:
 Post Falls School District from 1973 to 1975
 Post Falls and Coeur d'Alene Schools from 1973 to 1977
 Coeur d'Alene School District from 1975 to 1977
 Post Falls School District from 1977 to 1981
 East Valley School District from 1981 to 1996.
He was then City Administrator in City of Post Falls from 1996 to 2006. He is currently a Consultant at Hammond and Associates since 2006.

Hammond was:
 City Council member of Post Falls from 1982 to 1991
 Mayor of City of Post Falls from 1991 to 1996

Elections

2010 
Hammond won the Republican primary with 50.6% of the vote in a three way race against John Green and Jack Schroeder. Hammond was unopposed in the general election.

2008 
Hammond was unopposed in the Republican primary, and was unopposed in the general election.

2006 
Hammond was unopposed in the Republican primary. Hammond defeated Democratic nominee Charles W. "Chuck" Thomas with elected with 66.64% of the vote.

Committees 
He was a member of:
 Finance
 Finance Appropriations
 Health and Welfare
 Legislative Oversight
 Chair of Transportation.
 Board Member of Post Falls Chamber Board of Directors from 1991 to 2008
 Founding Member of Post Falls Education Foundation from 1998 to 2006
 Idaho State Board of Education from 1999 to 2004
 Chair of Idaho State Charter School Commission from 2004 to 2006
 Vice Chair of Idaho State Building Authority since 1997
 Senate Representative of Idaho Interoperability Executive Council since 2008
 Catastrophic Health Care fund since 2009.

Organizations
He is a member of:
 Former Board Member of United Way
 Founding Member of Post Falls Community Volunteers
 Secretary of Panhandle Area Council from 1991 to 2006
 Post Falls Education Foundation from 1993 to 2000
 Idaho State Board of Education from 1999 to 2004
 President of Idaho City Managers Association in 2000
 Chairman of Idaho State Charter School Commission from 2004 to 2006
 Post Falls Chamber of Commerce since 1991
 Jobs Plus

References

1950 births
Carroll College (Montana) alumni
Republican Party Idaho state senators
Living people
Mayors of places in Idaho
People from Post Falls, Idaho
Politicians from Missoula, Montana
School board members in Idaho
Schoolteachers from Idaho
Whitworth University alumni